Now & Forever – Best of Xandria is a compilation album by the German symphonic metal band Xandria, released on 6 June 2008 via Drakkar Entertainment label. The record was published as a package including a DVD containing live performances, music videos, and interviews.

Track listing

Personnel
All information from the album booklet.

Xandria
 Lisa Middelhauve – vocals
 Marco Heubaum – guitar, keyboards
 Philip Restemeier – guitar
 Roland Krueger – bass on tracks 3, 11, 13, 14, 17
 Daniel Joeriskes – bass on tracks 2, 5, 8, 18, 19
 Nils Middelhauve – bass on tracks 1, 4, 6, 7, 9, 10, 12, 15, 16, 20
 Gerit Lamm – drums

Production
 Vincent Sorg – remastering
 Ronald Matthes – director, executive producer (DVD)
 Kleif Baltes – editing assistant (DVD)
 Marcus Dattilo – editing assistant (DVD)
 Thomas Grummt – DVD authoring
 Jacky Lehmann – audio mixing (DVD)
 Jan-Paul Wass – video mixing, editing (DVD)
 Marius Kopec – executive producer (DVD)
 Kaja Kargus – editing (DVD)
 Wiebke Gürth – editing (DVD)

References

External links
Album lyrics on metal-archives.com
Official discography on xandria.de

Xandria albums
2008 compilation albums